This is a list of Croatian television related events from 2007.

Events
20 January - Konjanik actress Zrinka Cvitešić and her partner Nicolas Quesnoit win the first season of Ples sa zvijezdama.
21 December - Vedran Lovrenčić wins the fourth season of Big Brother.
22 December - Singer Luka Nižetić and his partner Mirjana Žutić win the second season of Ples sa zvijezdama.

Debuts

Television shows

2000s
Big Brother (2004-2008, 2016–present)
Zabranjena ljubav (2004-2008)
Ples sa zvijezdama (2006-2013)

Ending this year

Births

Deaths

References